The following is a list of Sporting Clube de Portugal managers.

List

Table key

External links

Official website:
Official club website

References

Lists of association football managers by club in Portugal
 
Sporting CP-related lists